Portage High School is a public high school in Portage, Indiana that serves grades 9 through 12.

The school has been in the area since the 1960s but can be dated back to the 1940s. The school serves the Portage, Indiana area as well as the South Haven area of Valparaiso, Indiana and Ogden Dunes, Indiana. The principal is Mike Stills. The school offers a wide range of classes including Advanced Placement classes and dual credit enrollment classes.

Athletics
Portage High School offers a wide range of athletics including:
 Football (State Champions, 1977 (3A))
 Soccer
 Baseball
 Basketball
 Track and field
 Cross country (State Champions: 1974, 1984, 1992, 1999)
 Volleyball
 Tennis
 Gymnastics (State Champions 1975, 2013)
 Golf
 Wrestling    
 Cheerleading
 Swimming 
 Softball (State Champions, 2000 (3A), 2013 (4A))

All sports compete in the Duneland Athletic Conference (DAC).

Publications
The Publications Department produces the school newspaper (the Pow Wow), the student yearbook the (Legend), and a website.

Notable alumni

 Darren Elkins - Indiana State Champion wrestler; professional mixed martial artist for the UFC's Featherweight Division
Brian Barnas - New Country 103.1 (WIRK) Promotions Director

See also
 List of high schools in Indiana

References

External links
 Official website

Schools in Porter County, Indiana
Public high schools in Indiana
1932 establishments in Indiana